WYEZ (100.7 FM) is a radio station broadcasting a soft adult contemporary format, simulcasting WEZV 105.9 FM North Myrtle Beach. It is licensed to Andrews, South Carolina, United States.  The station is owned by John and Blake Byrne, through licensee Byrne Acquisition Group MB, LLC.  Its studios are located in Myrtle Beach, South Carolina and its transmitter is located east of Andrews.

History
The station went on the air as WQSC on April 12, 1984.  On March 30, 1990, the station changed its call sign to WGTN-FM. At that time, the format was adult contemporary.

On May 2, 2019, WGTN-FM changed its call letters to WYEZ.

Prior to 2008, this station aired the programming of WYNA, which was classic hits "Cool 104.9" and later Bob FM, "We play anything." It now simulcasts WEZV.

References

External links

GTN-FM
Soft adult contemporary radio stations in the United States